Social Psychology as a Science, a monograph by Boris Parygin. The first monograph in social psychology written and published in the USSR in 1965.

History of creation
The book was published by the publishing house of Leningrad State University with a circulation of 3400 copies. That same 1965, Parygin’s pamphlet “What is Social Psychology” was published with a circulation of 5600 copies.
The publication of the monograph was preceded by the publication of a number of articles by B. D. Parygin, which offered the author's vision of the place and role of social psychology in the system of humanities and sciences, its subject and specifics in contrast to sociology and general psychology, the features and structural characteristics of its main manifestations.

Key ideas
The book "Social Psychology as a Science" for the first time presented and gave reasons for the author's theory of social psychology as a self-sufficient system of scientific knowledge, its methodology, subject and real-world application, structure, functions and status in the context of humanities and sciences. Parygin writes:

Value

The center of attention of the science of social psychology and its highest value was proclaimed a human as a person, with all the wealth of his relationships with other people, understood beyond the declared ideological attitudes, patterns and political dogmas. The publication of this book became a challenge of sorts to a totalitarian ideology based on the orthodox and vulgar-dogmatic interpretation of Marxism. Together with the second monograph published in 1966 — "Public Mood”, Parygin’s books became for Russia a sign of its time in the humanities. The basic provisions and innovations of the work became part of the fundamental research published in 1971, "Fundamentals of socio-psychological theory."

In 1967, on the basis of published books, at a session of the academic council of the faculty of philosophy of LSU, B. D. Parygin defended the first in the USSR doctoral dissertation on social psychology.

Among those who influenced Parygin’s worldview are the following names: Gordon Allport, Gustave Le Bon, Karl Marx, Friedrich Engels, George Plekhanov, Jacob Moreno, Sigmund Freud, Arthur Schopenhauer, Nicolai Hartmann, Georges Gurvitch, Talcott Parsons, Erich Fromm, Paul Baran.

Editions
Two years later, in 1967, after the author's refinements and supplements, Parygin's monograph “Social Psychology as a Science” was reprinted in Leningrad with a circulation of 15,000 copies. and translated into a number of languages. We know translations of the book into Czech, Bulgarian, Spanish and Portuguese; re-editions were made in Czechoslovakia (Prague, 1968), Bulgaria (Sofia, 1968), Uruguay (Montevideo, 1967) and Brazil (Rio de Janeiro, 1972).

 Парыгин Б. Д. Социальная психология как наука. — Л.: ЛГУ, 1965. — 208 с. (Russian)
 Парыгин Б. Д. Социальная психология как наука (издание 2-е исправленное и дополненное). — Л.: Лениздат, 1967. — 264 с. (Russian)
 Pariguin B. D. A psicologia social como ciência. Rio de Janeiro: Zahar Ed., 1972. — 218 p. (Portuguese).
 Паригин Б. Д. Социалната психология като наука. София, 1968. — 240 с. (Bulgarian)
 Parygin B. D. Sociialni psychologie jako veda. Praha, 1968. — 192 s.(Czech)
 Paryguin B. D. La psicologia social como ciencia. — Montevideo: Pueblos Unidos, 1967. — 249 p. (Spanish)

References

Books about social psychology